The Tichborne Affair is a 1975 Australian television film directed by Carl Schultz and starring Hugh Keays-Byrne, Neil Fitzpatrick, and Ken Goodlet. It is based on the Tichborne case.

The film won Best One Shot Drama and Best Director at the Penguin Awards.

References

External links

The Tichborne Affair at AustLit

Australian television films
1975 television films
1975 films
Australian films based on actual events
1970s English-language films